He Hired the Boss is a 1943 American comedy film directed by Thomas Z. Loring and written by Irving Cummings Jr. and Ben Markson. The film stars Stuart Erwin, Evelyn Venable, Thurston Hall, Vivian Blaine, William T. Orr and Benny Bartlett. The film was released on April 2, 1943, by 20th Century Fox.

Plot

Hubert Wilkins is a bookkeeper and an air-raid warden in his town. He wants to marry Emily Conway, the company's secretary, but is short of money.

Both are fired after persuading the boss's son, Don Bates, to elope with Sally Conway, his sweetheart. But after Hubert uncovers a crime, he also discovers that he owns property worth $100,000.

Cast  
 
Stuart Erwin as Hubert Wilkins
Evelyn Venable as Emily Conway
Thurston Hall as Mr. Bates
Vivian Blaine as Sally Conway
William T. Orr as Don Bates
Benny Bartlett as Jimmy
James Bush as Clark
Chick Chandler as Fuller
Hugh Beaumont as Jordan
Ray Walker as Salesman

References

External links 
 

1943 films
1943 comedy films
1940s English-language films
20th Century Fox films
American comedy films
American black-and-white films
Films directed by Thomas Z. Loring
Films scored by David Buttolph
Films scored by David Raksin
Films scored by Lionel Newman
1940s American films